In information technology, a disparate system or a disparate data system is a computer data processing system that was designed to operate as a fundamentally distinct  data processing system without exchanging data or interacting with other computer data processing systems.  Legacy systems are examples of disparate data systems, as are heterogeneous database data systems.  A disparate system is often characterized as an information silo because of the data system's isolation from or incompatibility with any other data systems.

Overview
Each data system may be envisioned as being composed of a software layer or applications architecture, a data layer or data architecture, and a data processing environment layer or technical architecture.   Any of these three layers may contribute to forming a disparate data system.

See also

References

Information technology
Information systems
Data partitioning